Scene It? is an interactive film series created by Screenlife Games, in which players answer trivia questions about films or pop culture. The games were first developed to be played with questions read from trivia cards or viewed on a television from an included DVD or based on clips from movies, TV shows, music videos, sports and other popular culture phenomena. Scene It? was made available as a mobile game for iPhone, iPad, on Xbox 360, PlayStation 3 and Wii as well as two social network games on Facebook. The series was discontinued in 2012, after Paramount Pictures, who owned Screenlife Games after 2008, closed the studio. The series was revived in 2022 by Imagination Games, with streaming functionality replacing DVDs.

History
Creator Dave Long made the first prototype of Scene It? in 1992 for a Halloween party, when he placed several hit films on a VHS tape and had guests identify them as quickly as possible when they played on screen. He spent the next few years developing it into a board game, initially scrapping it due to the limitations of VHS before reviving it upon discovering DVD in 2000.  In 2000, Long finalized the DVD and named it 'Reel to Real'. He then contacted local investors to bring his game onto shelves. After setting a brand, Scene It? was released to the public in 2002, and the game was turned into a series.

Gameplay
Players choose either a short or long game by adjusting the "Flextime" game board: For a short game, the board is folded so fewer spaces show. Each player throws a six-sided die to see who goes first. Then, the player rolls both the ordinary die and a customized eight-sided "category die" to see how far they move, and what challenge they face. The challenge can range from a trivia card question, a DVD challenge, ("My Play" or "All Play"), or they may have to draw a "Buzz card" (Cards are often renamed in special editions, such as a "Prime Directive" card in the Star Trek edition).  If the roller wins the challenge, they can go again, but if they lose, the dice are handed to the next player. This process keeps going until someone hits the All Play to Win stop sign, in which that player must win one final All Play, in which everyone participates, in order to win. If not, they go to ring 3 of the zone called Final Cut. There, they must answer 3 questions right. If that falls through, then on the next turn they only have to answer 2 questions, and if they fail that as well, they answer 1 question on every following turn. If a Final Cut challenge is won, then they win the game, and they get to watch a victory scene on the DVD.

Optreve DVD Enhancement Technology 
All board game versions of Scene It? use a DVD that is designed to reshuffle itself every time it is inserted into the DVD player. In some instances, the DVD player may reset the system, and in this case, the DVD will reshuffle itself before returning players to the game menu. If a question from a previous game is shown in the same session, players can hit the "Return" button on their remote in order to start a new question. Some DVD players do not support this technology, but players can choose from 20 to 25 (depends on version) pre-set games to play. As their title suggests, these game sets are not random, and stay constant, no matter how many times the DVD is reset.

Gamestar+ 
In 2022, Screenlife and Paramount revived Scene It? as now a streaming board game on TVs, computers, smartphones and tablets.

Releases
Movie Edition
Deluxe Movie Edition
 Deluxe Sequel Pack
 Junior Edition
 Music Edition
 TV Edition
 Harry Potter 1st Edition (2005)
 Harry Potter 2nd Edition (2007)
 Harry Potter The Complete Cinematic Journey (2011)
 Disney Edition (2003)
 Sports Edition
 Squabble Edition
  Edition
 Warner Bros. Television 50th Anniversary Edition
 James Bond Edition
 HBO Edition
 Turner Classic Movies Edition
 Nickelodeon Edition
 Marvel Comics Edition
 Friends Edition
 Friends Deluxe Edition
 Movie 2nd Edition
 Deluxe Movie 2nd Edition
 Disney 2nd Edition
 Pirates of the Caribbean Edition
 Doctor Who Edition 
 The O.C. Edition 
 FIFA Edition 
 Disney Channel Edition
 Seinfeld Edition
 Star Trek Edition
 Disney Magical Moments Edition
 The Simpsons Edition
 80s Edition
 Twilight & Twilight Saga Editions
 Comedy Movies Edition
 Glee Edition (this was the last game in the series)
 Star Wars Edition (canceled)
 Movie Night Edition (canceled)
 Movie Edition (2022)

Video games

A video game version of Scene It?, entitled Scene It? Lights, Camera, Action was released for the Xbox 360 on November 6, 2007. It featured 20 new game modes/categories and special game show-style "Big Button Controllers". The first sequel, Scene It? Box Office Smash was released on October 28, 2008, featuring the new Xbox 360 Avatars. A second sequel, Scene It? Bright Lights! Big Screen! was released on November 17, 2009, for Xbox 360, PlayStation 3, and Wii. Opting for a multi-platform approach, this title abandoned the avatars in favor of more generic characters.  After Scene It? Twilight two sequels were released: on November 18, 2010, Scene It? Harry Potter HD for iOS and on November 30, 2011, Scene It? Movie Night for Xbox 360 and PlayStation 3.

Two unsuccessful, web-only versions of the game, Scene It? Online, and Scene It? Daily, were made available online, on Facebook, and on mobile platforms. Scene It? Online borrowed strongly from the DVD games' format, including video clips, sound clips, and puzzles. Scene It? Daily was predominantly text based, and represented a major departure from the multimedia-centric roots of the series.

References

 
Games and sports introduced in 2002
2002 video games
DVD interactive technology
Party board games
Mattel games
Video board games
Video games scored by George Sanger
Video games developed in the United States